The Somali National Army (Somali: Ciidanka Xooga Dalka Soomaaliyeed, lit. "Somali Ground Forces") is the ground forces component of the Somali Armed Forces, and is the largest out of the three service branches that make up the majority of the Armed Forces.

Since the nation's independence in 1960, the Army was engaged in various military operations in the Cold War to expand and increase Somalia's sphere of influence throughout the Horn of Africa counter to Ethiopia's and Kenya's ambitions, because of this, Somalia had amassed large ground forces.

History 

The Trust Territory of Somalia established a national army to defend the nascent Somali Republic's borders. A law to that effect was passed on 6 April 1960. Thus the Somali Police Force's Mobile Group (Darawishta Poliska or Darawishta) was formed. 12 April 1960 has since been marked as Armed Forces Day. British Somaliland became independent on 26 June 1960 as the State of Somaliland, and the Trust Territory of Somalia (the former Italian Somaliland) followed suit five days later. On 1 July 1960, the two territories united to form the Somali Republic.

The Somali National Army can trace its roots back to troops used by the Ifat Sultanate as the successful conquest of Shewa by the Ifat Sultanate ignited a rivalry for supremacy with the Solomonic dynasty. 

The army was tested in 1964 when the conflict with Ethiopia over the Somali-inhabited Ogaden erupted into warfare. On 16 June 1963, Somali guerrillas started an insurgency at Hodayo, in eastern Ethiopia, a watering place north of Werder, after Ethiopian Emperor Haile Selassie rejected their demand for self-government in the Ogaden. The Somali government initially refused to support the guerrilla forces, which eventually numbered about 3,000. However, in January 1964, after Ethiopia sent reinforcements to the Ogaden, Somali forces launched ground and air attacks across the border and started providing assistance to the guerrillas. The Ethiopian Air Force responded with punitive strikes across its southwestern frontier against Feerfeer, northeast of Beledweyne, and Galkayo. On 6 March 1964, Somalia and Ethiopia agreed to a cease-fire. At the end of the month, the two sides signed an accord in Khartoum, Sudan, agreeing to withdraw their troops from the border, cease hostile propaganda, and start peace negotiations. Somalia also terminated its support of the guerrillas.

Equipment

Army equipment, 1981 
The following were the Somali National Army's major weapons in 1981:

Army equipment, 1989 
Prior arms acquisitions included the following equipment, much of which was unserviceable as of June 1989: 

293 main battle tanks (30 Centurion from Kuwait, 123 M47 Patton, 30 T-34, 110 T-54/55 from various sources). Other armoured fighting vehicles included 10 M41 Walker Bulldog light tanks, 30 BRDM-2 and 15 Panhard AML-90 armored cars (formerly owned by Saudi Arabia). The IISS estimated in 1989 that there were 474 armoured personnel carriers, including 64 BTR-40, BTR-50, BTR-60; 100 BTR-152 wheeled armored personnel carriers, 310 Fiat 6614 and 6616s, and that BMR-600s had been reported. The IISS estimated that there were 210 towed artillery pieces (8 M-1944 100 mm, 100 M-56 105 mm, 84 M-1938 122 mm, and 18 M198 155 mm towed howitzers). Other equipment reported by the IISS included 82 mm and 120 mm mortars, 100 Milan and BGM-71 TOW anti-tank guided missiles, rocket launchers, recoilless rifles, and a variety of Soviet air defence guns of 20 mm, 23 mm, 37 mm, 40 mm, 57 mm, and 100 mm calibre.

Ranks and insignia

Officers

Enlisted

See also

References

Further reading 
 Baffour Agyeman-Duah, The Horn of Africa: Conflict, Demilitarization and Reconstruction, Journal of Conflict Studies, Vol. 16, No. 2, 1996, accessed at https://journals.lib.unb.ca/index.php/JCS/article/view/11813/12632#a50
 Brian Crozier, The Soviet Presence in Somalia, Institute for the Study of Conflict, London, 1975
 Irving Kaplan et al., Area Handbook for Somalia, American University, 1969.
 Nilsson, Claes, and Johan Norberg, "European Union Training Mission Somalia: A Mission Assessment", Swedish National Defence Research Institute, 2014.
 
 Zacchia, Paolo B.; Harborne, Bernard; Sims, Jeff. 2017. Somalia - Security and Justice Sector Public Expenditure Review. Washington, D.C.: World Bank Group. http://documents.worldbank.org/curated/en/644671486531571103/Somalia-Security-and-justice-sector-public-expenditure-review

Armies by country
Military of Somalia